İTÜ—Ayazağa is an underground rapid transit station on the M2 line of the Istanbul Metro. It is located under Büyükdere Avenue in Maslak, the second largest financial district in Istanbul after Levent. The station services the Istanbul Technical University or İTÜ as well as the Maslak financial district. İ.T.Ü.-Ayazağa has an island platform serviced by two tracks. The station was opened on 31 January 2009 as part of the northern extension of the M2 line.

Layout

References

Railway stations opened in 2009
Istanbul metro stations
Sarıyer
2009 establishments in Turkey